The Grammy Award for Best Performance by a Chorus was awarded from 1961 to 1968.  In its first year, the award specified that a "chorus" contains seven or more artists.  This award was presented alongside the award for Best Performance by a Vocal Group.  Before 1961 these awards were combined into the Grammy Award for Best Performance by a Vocal Group or Chorus.

Although in the "pop" field the award did not specify pop music performances.  In 1969 and 1970 a pop-specific award was presented for Best Contemporary Performance by a Chorus.

Years reflect the year in which the Grammy Awards were presented, for works released in the previous year.

Recipients

References

General
  Note: User must select the "Pop" category as the genre under the search feature.

Specific

External links
 Official site

 
Grammy Award categories
Choirs